The 2000–01 NBA season was the Bucks' 33rd season in the National Basketball Association. During the off-season, the Bucks acquired Lindsey Hunter from the Detroit Pistons, acquired Jason Caffey from the Golden State Warriors, acquired top draft pick Joel Przybilla from the Houston Rockets, and signed free agents Jerome Kersey and Mark Pope. The Bucks got off to a rough start losing nine of their first twelve games, but would win 23 of their next 29 games while posting an 8-game winning streak in January, and holding a 29–18 record at the All-Star break. The Bucks finished first place in the Central Division with a 52–30 record, the franchise's best record since 1985–86.

Ray Allen and Glenn Robinson both led the team in scoring averaging 22.0 points per game each, and were both selected for the 2001 NBA All-Star Game, while Allen was named to the All-NBA Third Team. Allen also led the team with 1.5 steals per game, while Robinson contributed 6.9 rebounds per game, and Sam Cassell provided the team with 18.2 points and 7.6 assists per game. Off the bench, sixth man Tim Thomas averaged 12.6 points per game, while Hunter contributed 10.1 points per game, and Ervin Johnson led the team with 7.5 rebounds per game. Thomas also finished in second place in Sixth Man of the Year voting.

In the Eastern Conference First Round of the playoffs, led by the trio of Allen, Robinson and Cassell, the Bucks defeated the Orlando Magic in four games. It was the first time the Bucks made it out of the NBA playoffs' first round since 1988–89. In the Eastern Conference Semi-finals, they trailed 3–2 against the 6th-seeded Charlotte Hornets, but managed to win the series in seven games, advancing to the Conference Finals for the first time since 1986. In the Eastern Conference Finals, the Bucks faced regular season MVP Allen Iverson and the top-seeded Philadelphia 76ers. The Bucks took a 2–1 series lead, but would lose to the Sixers in seven games. Scott Williams, who had started every game during the Bucks' postseason run, was controversially suspended hours before Game 7 of the Eastern Conference Finals series, when a flagrant one foul was upgraded to a flagrant two foul after the game had ended. The Sixers would reach the NBA Finals, but would lose in five games to the defending champion Los Angeles Lakers.

Following the season, Hunter was traded to the Los Angeles Lakers, while Williams was dealt to the Denver Nuggets, and Kersey retired. Until 2019, the 2000–01 season was the last time the Bucks won 50 games, made it past the opening round of the NBA playoffs, and made it to the Eastern Conference Finals.

Draft picks

Roster

Regular season

Season standings

z – clinched division title
y – clinched division title
x – clinched playoff spot

Record vs. opponents

Game log

|- style="background:#fcc;"
| 1 || October 31 || @ Dallas
| 
| Ray Allen (26)
| Darvin Ham (13)
| Sam Cassell (7)
| Reunion Arena16,600
| 0–1

|- style="background:#fcc;"
| 2 || November 2 || @ Houston
| 
| Glenn Robinson (24)
| Glenn Robinson (7)
| Sam Cassell (10)
| Compaq Center10,687
| 0–2
|- style="background:#bfb;"
| 3 || November 4 || Detroit
| 
| Sam Cassell (20)
| Glenn Robinson (8)
| Robinson, Allen (6)
| Bradley Center18,717
| 1–2
|- style="background:#fcc;"
| 4 || November 7 || New York
| 
| Glenn Robinson (21)
| Thomas, Allen (7)
| Sam Cassell (6)
| Bradley Center14,246
| 1–3
|- style="background:#fcc;"
| 5 || November 8 || @ Indiana
| 
| Sam Cassell (29)
| Ervin Johnson (10)
| Sam Cassell (12)
| Conseco Fieldhouse17,684
| 1–4
|- style="background:#fcc;"
| 6 || November 11 || Minnesota
| 
| Ray Allen (40)
| Ervin Johnson (6)
| Sam Cassell (9)
| Bradley Center18,717
| 1–5
|- style="background:#bfb;"
| 7 || November 15 || Atlanta
| 
| Glenn Robinson (21)
| Ervin Johnson (12)
| Sam Cassell (6)
| Bradley Center13,217
| 2–5
|- style="background:#bfb;"
| 8 || November 17 || Cleveland
| 
| Ray Allen (23)
| Glenn Robinson (8)
| Sam Cassell (11)
| Bradley Center13,874
| 3–5
|- style="background:#fcc;"
| 9 || November 18 || @ Toronto
| 
| Ray Allen (29)
| Glenn Robinson (13)
| Sam Cassell (8)
| Air Canada Centre19,800
| 3–6
|- style="background:#fcc;"
| 10 || November 22 || Portland
| 
| Glenn Robinson (20)
| Ervin Johnson (9)
| Lindsey Hunter (7)
| Bradley Center15,208
| 3–7
|- style="background:#fcc;"
| 11 || November 24 || Charlotte
| 
| Ray Allen (21)
| Jason Caffey (7)
| Rafer Alston (7)
| Bradley Center15,102
| 3–8
|- style="background:#fcc;"
| 12 || November 25 || @ Washington
| 
| Ray Allen (37)
| Cassell, Caffey (9)
| Allen, Cassell (5)
| MCI Center13,157
| 3–9
|- style="background:#bfb;"
| 13 || November 27 || @ Orlando
| 
| Ray Allen (23)
| Ervin Johnson (9)
| Sam Cassell (6)
| TD Waterhouse Centre12,841
| 4–9
|- style="background:#bfb;"
| 14 || November 28 || @ Miami
| 
| Glenn Robinson (22)
| Ervin Johnson (14)
| Sam Cassell (5)
| American Airlines Arena19,800
| 5–9
|- style="background:#bfb;"
| 15 || November 30 || Boston
| 
| Glenn Robinson (25)
| Ervin Johnson (8)
| Sam Cassell (14)
| Bradley Center13,247
| 6–9

|- style="background:#fcc;"
| 16 || December 2 || @ Atlanta
| 
| Ray Allen (19)
| Ervin Johnson (9)
| Sam Cassell (5)
| Philips Arena9,827
| 6–10
|- style="background:#bfb;"
| 17 || December 3 || Indiana
| 
| Glenn Robinson (24)
| Tim Thomas (12)
| Sam Cassell (7)
| Bradley Center15,446
| 7–10
|- style="background:#bfb;"
| 18 || December 6 || @ New Jersey
| 
| Ray Allen (30)
| Robinson, Johnson, Williams (7)
| Sam Cassell (14)
| Continental Airlines Arena11,420
| 8–10
|- style="background:#fcc;"
| 19 || December 7 || Phoenix
| 
| Glenn Robinson (26)
| Glenn Robinson (10)
| Allen, Cassell (6)
| Bradley Center14,236
| 8–11
|- style="background:#bfb;"
| 20 || December 9 || Washington
| 
| Allen, Robinson (22)
| Glenn Robinson (12)
| Robinson, Cassell (7)
| Bradley Center15,768
| 9–11
|- style="background:#bfb;"
| 21 || December 12 || @ L.A. Lakers
| 
| Ray Allen (35)
| Glenn Robinson (13)
| Sam Cassell (7)
| Staples Center18,997
| 10–11
|- style="background:#bfb;"
| 22 || December 13 || @ Utah
| 
| Glenn Robinson (32)
| Glenn Robinson (9)
| Lindsey Hunter (5)
| Delta Center,18,450
| 11–11
|- style="background:#bfb;"
| 23 || December 15 || Toronto
| 
| Glenn Robinson (31)
| Ervin Johnson (11)
| Sam Cassell (8)
| Bradley Center16,432
| 12–11
|- style="background:#fcc;"
| 24 || December 17 || @ New York
| 
| Glenn Robinson (23)
| Glenn Robinson (11)
| Glenn Robinson (5)
| Madison Square Garden19,763
| 12–12
|- style="background:#bfb;"
| 25 || December 21 || New Jersey
| 
| Allen, Thomas (16)
| Robinson, Caffey (11)
| Robinson, Allen (4)
| Bradley Center13,439
| 13–12
|- style="background:#bfb;"
| 26 || December 23 || Boston
| 
| Glenn Robinson (28)
| Ervin Johnson (13)
| Sam Cassell (6)
| Bradley Center14,786
| 14–12
|- style="background:#bfb;"
| 27 || December 26 || Orlando
| 
| Ray Allen (25)
| Robinson, Johnson (9)
| Allen, Cassell, Hunter (6)
| Bradley Center16,089
| 15–12
|- style="background:#bfb;"
| 28 || December 28 || @ Cleveland
| 
| Allen, Cassell (23)
| Scott Williams (8)
| Sam Cassell (6)
| Gund Arena18,225
| 16–12
|- style="background:#fcc;"
| 29 || December 30 || @ Denver
| 
| Glenn Robinson (31)
| Glenn Robinson (9)
| Lindsey Hunter (9)
| Pepsi Center15,330
| 16–13

|- style="background:#bfb;"
| 30 || January 2 || @ Chicago
| 
| Glenn Robinson (21)
| Scott Williams (11)
| Glenn Robinson (5)
| United Center20,569
| 17–13
|- style="background:#bfb;"
| 31 || January 3 || Cleveland
| 
| Ray Allen (25)
| Tim Thomas (10)
| Glenn Robinson (7)
| Bradley Center13,817
| 18–13
|- style="background:#fcc;"
| 32 || January 5 || @ Portland
| 
| Tim Thomas (39)
| Glenn Robinson (7)
| Sam Cassell (10)
| Rose Garden20,580
| 18–14
|- style="background:#fcc;"
| 33 || January 7 || @ Vancouver
| 
| Glenn Robinson (31)
| Sam Cassell (8)
| Ray Allen (7)
| General Motors Place11,771
| 18–15
|- style="background:#bfb;"
| 34 || January 9 || Washington
| 
| Sam Cassell (23)
| Tim Thomas (11)
| Sam Cassell (7)
| Bradley Center13,397
| 19–15
|- style="background:#bfb;"
| 35 || January 11 || Dallas
| 
| Sam Cassell (21)
| Glenn Robinson (10)
| Sam Cassell (9)
| Bradley Center15,675
| 20–15
|- style="background:#bfb;"
| 36 || January 13 || New Jersey
| 
| Glenn Robinson (35)
| Scott Williams (7)
| Sam Cassell (13)
| Bradley Center18,717
| 21–15
|- style="background:#bfb;"
| 37 || January 15 || @ Washington
| 
| Glenn Robinson (22)
| Ervin Johnson (8)
| Sam Cassell (6)
| MCI Center15,633
| 22–15
|- style="background:#bfb;"
| 38 || January 16 || L.A. Clippers
| 
| Ray Allen (32)
| Glenn Robinson (12)
| Sam Cassell (14)
| Bradley Center15,267
| 23–15
|- style="background:#bfb;"
| 39 || January 19 || @ Charlotte
| 
| Sam Cassell (23)
| Sam Cassell (8)
| Ray Allen (7)
| Charlotte Coliseum16,436
| 24–15
|- style="background:#bfb;"
| 40 || January 21 || @ Detroit
| 
| Glenn Robinson (26)
| Robinson, Williams (8)
| Sam Cassell (7)
| The Palace of Auburn Hills13,357
| 25–15
|- style="background:#bfb;"
| 41 || January 23 || New York
| 
| Sam Cassell (22)
| Ervin Johnson (10)
| Robinson, Cassell (6)
| Bradley Center18,717
| 26–15
|- style="background:#fcc;"
| 42 || January 27 || Detroit
| 
| Glenn Robinson (34)
| Ray Allen (10)
| Sam Cassell (16)
| Bradley Center18,717
| 26–16
|- style="background:#fcc;"
| 43 || January 29 || @ Minnesota
| 
| Glenn Robinson (25)
| Ervin Johnson (12)
| Rafer Alston (8)
| Target Center17,171
| 26–17
|- style="background:#bfb;"
| 44 || January 31 || Denver
| 
| Ray Allen (32)
| Tim Thomas (8)
| Ray Allen (11)
| Bradley Center15,786
| 27–17

|- style="background:#bfb;"
| 45 || February 3 || Indiana
| 
| Sam Cassell (23)
| Scott Williams (9)
| Sam Cassell (9)
| Bradley Center17,517
| 28–17
|- style="background:#bfb;"
| 46 || February 6 || Sacramento
| 
| Sam Cassell (29)
| Ervin Johnson (9)
| Sam Cassell (12)
| Bradley Center17,329
| 29–17
|- style="background:#fcc;"
| 47 || February 7 || @ Boston
| 
| Tim Thomas (21)
| Glenn Robinson (15)
| Ray Allen (11)
| FleetCenter13,493
| 29–18
|- style="background:#fcc;"
| 48 || February 13 || Philadelphia
| 
| Glenn Robinson (28)
| Ervin Johnson (14)
| Sam Cassell (13)
| Bradley Center18,717
| 29–19
|- style="background:#bfb;"
| 49 || February 14 || @ Atlanta
| 
| Sam Cassell (25)
| Ervin Johnson (11)
| Sam Cassell (7)
| Philips Arena11,653
| 30–19
|- style="background:#fcc;"
| 50 || February 17 || Charlotte
| 
| Ray Allen (30)
| Joel Przybilla (9)
| Sam Cassell (13)
| Bradley Center18,717
| 30–20
|- style="background:#bfb;"
| 51 || February 19 || San Antonio
| 
| Robinson, Allen (23)
| Jason Caffey (11)
| Sam Cassell (9)
| Bradley Center16,487
| 31–20
|- style="background:#bfb;"
| 52 || February 20 || @ Chicago
| 
| Ray Allen (34)
| Allen, Caffey (11)
| Sam Cassell (5)
| United Center21,558
| 32–20
|- style="background:#bfb;"
| 53 || February 23 || Vancouver
| 
| Ray Allen (29)
| Scott Williams (11)
| Allen, Cassell (7)
| Bradley Center17,682
| 33–20
|- style="background:#bfb;"
| 54 || February 25 || Golden State
| 
| Glenn Robinson (45)
| Ervin Johnson (15)
| Sam Cassell (10)
| Bradley Center18,411
| 34–20
|- style="background:#bfb;"
| 55 || February 26 || @ Philadelphia
| 
| Ray Allen (42)
| Ervin Johnson (10)
| Ray Allen (7)
| First Union Center20,324
| 35–20
|- style="background:#fcc;"
| 56 || February 28 || @ Indiana
| 
| Lindsey Hunter (21)
| Scott Williams (8)
| Ray Allen (5)
| Conseco Fieldhouse17,259
| 35–21

|- style="background:#fcc;"
| 57 || March 1 || Houston
| 
| Sam Cassell (23)
| Caffey, Williams (7)
| Sam Cassell (9)
| Bradley Center15,426
| 35–22
|- style="background:#bfb;"
| 58 || March 3 || Chicago
| 
| Sam Cassell (40)
| Ervin Johnson (13)
| Sam Cassell (10)
| Bradley Center18,717
| 36–22
|- style="background:#bfb;"
| 59 || March 5 || @ New Jersey
| 
| Ray Allen (23)
| Allen, Robinson (8)
| Cassell, Robinson, Hunter (5)
| Continental Airlines Arena3,216
| 37–22
|- style="background:#bfb;"
| 60 || March 7 || @ Boston
| 
| Sam Cassell (24)
| Robinson, Thomas (10)
| Sam Cassell (7)
| FleetCenter14,818
| 38–22
|- style="background:#fcc;"
| 61 || March 10 || @ Charlotte
| 
| Ray Allen (32)
| Glenn Robinson (10)
| Sam Cassell (8)
| Charlotte Coliseum18,472
| 38–23
|- style="background:#fcc;"
| 62 || March 11 || @ Cleveland
| 
| Glenn Robinson (32)
| Glenn Robinson (6)
| Sam Cassell (13)
| Gund Arena13,235
| 38–24
|- style="background:#bfb;"
| 63 || March 13 || @ Toronto
| 
| Ray Allen (29)
| Mark Pope (6)
| Ray Allen (7)
| Air Canada Centre19,800
| 39–24
|- style="background:#fcc;"
| 64 || March 15 || Seattle
| 
| Glenn Robinson (21)
| Ervin Johnson (9)
| Sam Cassell (11)
| Bradley Center16,112
| 39–25
|- style="background:#bfb;"
| 65 || March 17 || Philadelphia
| 
| Tim Thomas (22)
| Ervin Johnson (10)
| Ray Allen (10)
| Bradley Center18,717
| 40–25
|- style="background:#bfb;"
| 66 || March 18 || @ Detroit
| 
| Sam Cassell (21)
| Ray Allen (8)
| Cassell, Hunter (5)
| The Palace of Auburn Hills12,953
| 41–25
|- style="background:#bfb;"
| 67 || March 21 || L.A. Lakers
| 
| Sam Cassell (27)
| Ervin Johnson (6)
| Allen, Robinson (5)
| Bradley Center18,717
| 42–25
|- style="background:#bfb;"
| 68 || March 23 || Orlando
| 
| Glenn Robinson (26)
| Ray Allen (10)
| Sam Cassell (10)
| Bradley Center18,717
| 43–25
|- style="background:#bfb;"
| 69 || March 25 || Atlanta
| 
| Ray Allen (27)
| Ray Allen (11)
| Sam Cassell (11)
| Bradley Center18,717
| 44–25
|- style="background:#fcc;"
| 70 || March 26 || @ Philadelphia
| 
| Sam Cassell (20)
| Ervin Johnson (10)
| Sam Cassell (5)
| First Union Center20,561
| 44–26
|- style="background:#bfb;"
| 71 || March 29 || Miami
| 
| Glenn Robinson (27)
| Ervin Johnson (13)
| Ray Allen (8)
| Bradley Center18,574
| 45–26
|- style="background:#bfb;"
| 72 || March 31 || @ San Antonio
| 
| Sam Cassell (24)
| Ray Allen (11)
| Sam Cassell (9)
| Alamodome35,944
| 46–26

|- style="background:#fcc;"
| 73 || April 1 || @ Phoenix
| 
| Ray Allen (31)
| Darvin Ham (10)
| Rafer Alston (8)
| America West Arena18,464
| 46–27
|- style="background:#bfb;"
| 74 || April 3 || @ Sacramento
| 
| Sam Cassell (33)
| Ervin Johnson (14)
| Lindsey Hunter (6)
| ARCO Arena17,317
| 47–27
|- style="background:#bfb;"
| 75 || April 4 || @ Golden State
| 
| Robinson, Allen (26)
| Glenn Robinson (13)
| Sam Cassell (9)
| The Arena in Oakland11,600
| 48–27
|- style="background:#fcc;"
| 76 || April 6 || @ L.A. Clippers
| 
| Glenn Robinson (31)
| Glenn Robinson (11)
| Cassell, Robinson (5)
| Staples Center17,329
| 48–28
|- style="background:#fcc;"
| 77 || April 8 || @ Seattle
| 
| Ray Allen (20)
| Ervin Johnson (8)
| Sam Cassell (8)
| KeyArena15,575
| 48–29
|- style="background:#bfb;"
| 78 || April 10 || Chicago
| 
| Scott Williams (24)
| Scott Williams (14)
| Sam Cassell (12)
| Bradley Center18,717
| 49–29
|- style="background:#bfb;"
| 79 || April 12 || Utah
| 
| Ray Allen (43)
| Ervin Johnson (11)
| Sam Cassell (9)
| Bradley Center18,717
| 50–29
|- style="background:#bfb;"
| 80 || April 14 || Toronto
| 
| Ray Allen (31)
| Ervin Johnson (10)
| Sam Cassell (9)
| Bradley Center18,717
| 51–29
|- style="background:#bfb;"
| 81 || April 16 || @ Orlando
| 
| Glenn Robinson (19)
| Scott Williams (14)
| Cassell, Allen (7)
| TD Waterhouse Centre17,248
| 52–29
|- style="background:#fcc;"
| 82 || April 17 || @ Miami
| 
| Glenn Robinson (22)
| Ervin Johnson (7)
| Rafer Alston (6)
| American Airlines Arena16,500
| 52–30

Playoffs

|- align="center" bgcolor="#ccffcc"
| 1
| April 22
| Orlando
| W 103–90
| Scott Williams (19)
| Scott Williams (16)
| Sam Cassell (8)
| Bradley Center18,717
| 1–0
|- align="center" bgcolor="#ccffcc"
| 2
| April 25
| Orlando
| W 103–96
| Ray Allen (27)
| Ervin Johnson (13)
| Ray Allen (7)
| Bradley Center18,717
| 2–0
|- align="center" bgcolor="#ffcccc"
| 3
| April 28
| @ Orlando
| L 116–121 (OT)
| Ray Allen (27)
| Sam Cassell (16)
| Ray Allen (6)
| TD Waterhouse Centre17,248
| 2–1
|- align="center" bgcolor="#ccffcc"
| 4
| May 1
| @ Orlando
| W 112–104
| Ray Allen (26)
| Tim Thomas (10)
| Sam Cassell (6)
| TD Waterhouse Centre17,248
| 3–1
|-

|- align="center" bgcolor="#ccffcc"
| 1
| May 6
| Charlotte
| W 104–92
| Ray Allen (26)
| Ervin Johnson (12)
| Glenn Robinson (11)
| Bradley Center18,717
| 1–0
|- align="center" bgcolor="#ccffcc"
| 2
| May 8
| Charlotte
| W 91–90
| Ray Allen (28)
| Ervin Johnson (12)
| Ray Allen (9)
| Bradley Center18,717
| 2–0
|- align="center" bgcolor="#ffcccc"
| 3
| May 10
| @ Charlotte
| L 92–102
| Glenn Robinson (23)
| Scott Williams (10)
| Sam Cassell (9)
| Charlotte Coliseum17,392
| 2–1
|- align="center" bgcolor="#ffcccc"
| 4
| May 13
| @ Charlotte
| L 78–85
| Ray Allen (19)
| Glenn Robinson (12)
| Ray Allen (10)
| Charlotte Coliseum18,756
| 2–2
|- align="center" bgcolor="#ffcccc"
| 5
| May 15
| Charlotte
| L 86–94
| Glenn Robinson (22)
| Ervin Johnson (17)
| Ray Allen (7)
| Bradley Center18,717
| 2–3
|- align="center" bgcolor="#ccffcc"
| 6
| May 17
| @ Charlotte
| W 104–97
| Sam Cassell (33)
| Ervin Johnson (13)
| Sam Cassell (11)
| Charlotte Coliseum23,509
| 3–3
|- align="center" bgcolor="#ccffcc"
| 7
| May 20
| Charlotte
| W 104–95
| Glenn Robinson (29)
| Ervin Johnson (11)
| Sam Cassell (13)
| Bradley Center18,717
| 4–3
|-

|- align="center" bgcolor="#ffcccc"
| 1
| May 22
| @ Philadelphia
| L 85–93
| Ray Allen (31)
| Ervin Johnson (15)
| Allen, Cassell (7)
| First Union Center20,877
| 0–1
|- align="center" bgcolor="#ccffcc"
| 2
| May 24
| @ Philadelphia
| W 92–78
| Ray Allen (38)
| Ervin Johnson (7)
| Sam Cassell (11)
| First Union Center20,998
| 1–1
|- align="center" bgcolor="#ccffcc"
| 3
| May 26
| Philadelphia
| W 80–74
| Sam Cassell (24)
| Ervin Johnson (13)
| Ray Allen (5)
| Bradley Center18,717
| 2–1
|- align="center" bgcolor="#ffcccc"
| 4
| May 28
| Philadelphia
| L 83–89
| Glenn Robinson (20)
| Ervin Johnson (17)
| Ray Allen (6)
| Bradley Center18,717
| 2–2
|- align="center" bgcolor="#ffcccc"
| 5
| May 30
| @ Philadelphia
| L 88–89
| Glenn Robinson (22)
| Sam Cassell (12)
| Allen, Cassell (4)
| First Union Center21,087
| 2–3
|- align="center" bgcolor="#ccffcc"
| 6
| June 1
| Philadelphia
| W 110–100
| Ray Allen (41)
| Ervin Johnson (12)
| Sam Cassell (11)
| Bradley Center18,717
| 3–3
|- align="center" bgcolor="#ffcccc"
| 7
| June 3
| @ Philadelphia
| L 91–108
| Ray Allen (26)
| Tim Thomas (12)
| Ray Allen (6)
| First Union Center21,046
| 3–4
|-

Player statistics

Season

Playoffs

Transactions

Trades

Free agents

Player Transactions Citation:

References

See also
 2000–01 NBA season

Milwaukee Bucks seasons
Milwaukee Bucks
Milwaukee Bucks
Milwaukee